Cyclones.tv is a regional sports network and streaming network founded in 2012 (and first went on the air on August 31, 2013) to carry sports broadcasting. Cyclones.tv focuses solely on Iowa State University athletics. The channel used to carry live sporting events, but with the addition of the Big 12 Now streaming channel on ESPN+, the channel is expected to only carry game replays, coaches shows, vignettes and historical pieces. In the past, the channel would carry a wide range of third-tier events, including one non-conference football game per year, a handful of home, non-conference men's basketball games, and most of all home events in sports such as women's basketball, volleyball, softball, women's soccer and wrestling.

Iowa State athletics first started to monetize the streaming of Iowa State football games through an online portal known as CloneZone. CloneZone was used to webcast a pay-per-view version of Iowa State athletics events until 2012, when the online portal was rebranded as Cyclones.tv. Cyclones.tv existed solely as an online portal until August 31, 2013, when Mediacom unveiled a new television channel in and around the state of Iowa.

Football Games Carried by Cyclones.tv 
Cyclones.tv carried a total of eight football games on traditional television, with the last game coming on December 1, 2018, as Iowa State hosted Drake.

References

Sports television networks in the United States